Job Wilhelm Georg Erdmann Erwin von Witzleben (4 December 1881 – 8 August 1944) was a German field marshal in the Wehrmacht during the Second World War. A leading conspirator in the 20 July plot to assassinate Adolf Hitler, he was designated to become Commander-in-Chief of the Wehrmacht in a post-Nazi regime had the plot succeeded.

Early years
Erwin von Witzleben was born in Breslau (now Wrocław, Poland) in the Prussian province of Silesia, the son of Georg von Witzleben (1838–1898), a Hauptmann (captain) in the Prussian Army, and his wife, Therese née Brandenburg. The Witzleben dynasty was an Uradel family of old nobility and many officers, descending from Witzleben in Thuringia.

He completed the Prussian Cadet Corps program at Liegnitz Ritter-Akademie, Prussian Silesia and in Lichterfelde near Berlin, and on 22 June 1901 joined the Grenadier Regiment König Wilhelm I No. 7 in Liegnitz, Silesia (now Legnica, Poland) as a Leutnant (lieutenant). In 1910, he was promoted to Oberleutnant (first lieutenant).

He was married to Else Kleeberg from Chemnitz, Saxony. The couple had a son and a daughter.

First World War
At the beginning of the First World War, Witzleben served as brigade adjutant in the 19th Reserve Infantry Brigade before being promoted to Hauptmann and company chief in the Reserve Infantry Regiment No.6 in October 1914. Later, in the same regiment, he became battalion commander. His unit fought in Verdun, the Champagne region and Flanders, among other places. He was seriously wounded and was awarded the Iron Cross, both first and second classes. Afterwards, he was sent to General Staff training and witnessed the war end as First General Staff Officer of the 121st Division.

Between the wars

In the Reichswehr of the Weimar Republic, Witzleben was promoted to company commander. In 1923, he found himself on the Fourth Division staff in Dresden as a Major. In 1928, he became battalion commander in Infantry Regiment No. 6 and retained that position as Oberstleutnant (lieutenant colonel) the following year. After being promoted to full Oberst (colonel) in 1931, he took over as commanding officer of the (Prussian) Infantry Regiment No. 8 in Frankfurt on the Oder.

Early in 1933, shortly before Adolf Hitler seized autocratic control of the German state via a paramilitary backed revolution with the passage in the Reichstag of the Enabling Act of 1933, Witzleben was transferred to the post of Infantry Leader VI in Hanover. He was promoted to Generalmajor (major general) on 1 February 1934 and moved to Potsdam as the new commander of the 3rd Infantry Division. He succeeded General Werner von Fritsch as commander of Wehrkreis III (Berlin (HQ), Brandenburg, parts of Neumark). In this position, he was promoted to Generalleutnant (lieutenant general) and in the newly established Wehrmacht forces became commanding general of Army Corps III in Berlin in September 1935. In 1936, he was promoted to a General of the Infantry (General der Infanterie).

As early as 1934, Witzleben indicated opposition against the Nazi regime when he and Manstein, Leeb, and Rundstedt demanded an inquiry into Schleicher's and Bredow's deaths in the Night of the Long Knives. As a result of that and his criticism of Hitler's persecution of Fritsch in the Blomberg–Fritsch Affair, Witzleben was temporarily forced into early retirement. His "retirement" did not last, however, as Hitler soon needed him in the preparations for the Second World War.

By 1938, Witzleben was a member of the Oster Conspiracy, a group of plotters including Generaloberst (Colonel General) Ludwig Beck, Generals Erich Hoepner and Carl-Heinrich von Stülpnagel, Admiral and Chief of the Abwehr Wilhelm Canaris and Abwehr Oberstleutnant (lieutenant colonel) Hans Oster. The men planned to overthrow Hitler in a military coup d'état and avert another European war, which seemed highly likely during the 1938 Sudeten Crisis, until the Munich Agreement both shocked and demoralized the plotters. Witzleben's unit, which including the key Berlin Defense District, was to have played a decisive role in the planned coup.

In November 1938, Witzleben had been installed as commander-in-chief of Army Group 2 in Frankfurt. He was also involved in Generaloberst Hammerstein-Equord's conspiracy plans of 1939. The latter planned to seize Hitler outright in a kind of frontal assault while the former would shut down the Nazi headquarters, but the plan also fell through.

Second World War

In September 1939, Witzleben, then a Generaloberst (Colonel General), took command of the 1st Army, stationed at the Western Front. When Germany attacked France on 10 May 1940, the First Army was part of Army Group C. On 14 June it broke through the Maginot line, and within three days had forced several French divisions to surrender. For this, Witzleben was decorated with the Knight's Cross of the Iron Cross; and on 19 July, he was promoted to Generalfeldmarschall (General Field Marshal) during the 1940 Field Marshal Ceremony.

In 1941 he was even appointed Commander-in-Chief OB West, succeeding Generalfeldmarschall Gerd von Rundstedt, but only a year later, he took leave from that position for health reasons. Some sources, however, claim that he was again forcibly retired at this time after he had criticised the regime for its invasion of the Soviet Union on 22 June 1941 in Operation Barbarossa.

20 July 1944

In 1944, the conspirators around Stauffenberg saw Witzleben as the key man in their plans. Whereas Generaloberst (Colonel General) Beck was seen as a prospective provisional head of state, and Generaloberst Hoepner was in line to command the inner Ersatzheer ("Replacement Army") forces, Witzleben was to become commander-in-chief of the Wehrmacht, becoming the ranking officer of the new regime. 

However, on 20 July 1944, the day of Stauffenberg's attempt on Hitler's life at the Wolf's Lair in East Prussia, Witzleben did not arrive at the Bendlerblock in Berlin from the OKH-HQ (Oberkommando des Heeres Headquarters) at Zossen to assume command of the coup forces until 8 p.m., when it was already clear that the coup attempt had failed. He then protested angrily that it had been bungled and left after 45 minutes to return to Zossen, where he reported the situation to General of the Artillery (General der Artillerie) Eduard Wagner and then drove back to his country estate, 30 mi away, where he was arrested the next day by Generalleutnant (Lieutenant General) Viktor Linnarz of the OKH personnel office.

He was then cast out of the Wehrmacht by the so-called Ehrenhof der Wehrmacht ("The Regular Army's Court of Honor"), a conclave of officers set up after the attempted assassination to remove officers from the Wehrmacht who had been involved in the plot, mainly so that they were no longer subject to German military law and could be arraigned to a show trial before the Nazi "People's Court" (Volksgerichtshof).

Trial and death
On 7 August 1944, Witzleben was in the first group of accused conspirators to be brought before the Volksgerichtshof. Ravaged by the conditions of his Gestapo arrest, he surprisingly approached the bench giving the Nazi salute, for which he was rebuked by the presiding judge Roland Freisler.

Witzleben was sentenced to death on the same day. Witzleben gave these closing words in court, addressed to Freisler:

Much of the Volksgerichtshof, including scenes of Witzleben's show trial, was filmed for the German weekly newsreel Die Deutsche Wochenschau; however, Propaganda Minister Joseph Goebbels decided against releasing the footage, firstly because Freisler's abusive ranting in the courtroom might draw sympathy for the accused and secondly because the regime wanted to quell public discussion of the event. The material was classified as secret (Geheime Reichssache).

Witzleben was put to death the same day at Plötzensee Prison in Berlin. By Hitler's direct orders, he was hanged with a meat hook and a thin hemp rope, which people who were not from the prison staff called a piano wire, and the execution was filmed. The footage has since been lost.

Decorations
 Iron Cross (1914)
 2nd Class
 1st Class
 Wound Badge (1914)
 in Black
 Knight's Cross of the House Order of Hohenzollern
 Knight of Justice of the Order of Saint John
 Honour Cross of the World War 1914/1918
 Sudetenland Medal
 West Wall Medal
 Iron Cross (1939)
 2nd Class
 1st Class
 Knight's Cross of the Iron Cross on 24 June 1940 as Generaloberst and commander of 1. Armee
 Military Merit Order, 4th class with Swords (Bavaria)
 Hanseatic Cross of Hamburg
 Cross of Honour 3rd Class with swords and crown (Reuss)
 Wound Badge of 1918 in Black
 Prussian Service Award Cross
 Silesian Eagle, 2nd class
 Knight of Honour of the Order of Saint John
 Wehrmacht Long Service Award, 1st class with Oak Leaves
 German Olympic Decoration, 1st class

Depiction in media
 East German actor Otto Dierichs depicted Witzleben in the 1970 Eastern Bloc co-production Liberation.
Joachim Bißmeier portrays Witzleben in the 2004 TV film, Stauffenberg.
 English actor David Schofield portrays Witzleben in the 2008 Bryan Singer film Valkyrie.

Notes about personal names
 The terms Schenk and Graf in "Claus Schenk Graf von Stauffenberg" began as titles, but are now considered additional name elements; following the revolution of 1918, titles of nobility were abolished in Germany. However, members of the families of the former nobility got around the law by making the title a part of the person's legal name. Schenk was a role-title ("Butler" or "Cup-bearer"); Graf was the title, meaning "Count".
 Likewise, the term Freiherr in "Kurt Freiherr von Hammerstein-Equord" is now also a name element, and not a title. Freiherr was roughly the equivalent of "Baron".

See also
 Assassination attempts on Adolf Hitler

References

Citations

Bibliography

External links
 http://www.dhm.de/lemo/html/biografien/WitzlebenErwin/index.html 
 

1881 births
1944 deaths
Military personnel from Wrocław
People from the Province of Silesia
German Army World War II field marshals
German Army personnel of World War I
Thuringian nobility
Protestants in the German Resistance
Executed military leaders
Prussian Army personnel
Executed members of the 20 July plot
People executed by hanging at Plötzensee Prison
Recipients of the Knight's Cross of the Iron Cross
Recipients of the clasp to the Iron Cross, 1st class
Lieutenant generals of the Reichswehr